Tomaj ( or) is a village in the Municipality of Sežana in the Littoral region of Slovenia, near the border with Italy.

Church
The parish church in the settlement is dedicated to Saints Peter and Paul and belongs to the Diocese of Koper. A second church is a small building next to the cemetery and is dedicated to the Virgin Mary.

Climate
Tomaj has a warm climate for Slovenia. Winters are mild with frequent rain and clouds. Snow is rare and occurs only a few times each winter. Also, sub freezing highs happen just twice a year. Lows hit freezing 68 days annually. Summer's are warm and sunny. Despite being sunny, summers have a lot of rain, with thunderstorms being quite common. There are only 17 days over 30 degrees, and 70 over 25 degrees. Fall is the wettest time of year, and late winter is the driest. Means range from 2.1 in January to 20.8 in July. Tomaj's climate is classified as Cfb or oceanic.

Notable people
Notable people that were born or lived in Tomaj include:
 Anton Černe (1813–1891), politician
 Urban Golmajer (1820–1905), priest, social care and education promoter, viticultural society founder
 Pavel Klapše (ca. 1688–1772), religious writer
 Pavel Knobl (1765–1830), poet and musician
 Srečko Kosovel (1904–1926), poet
 Matija Sila (1840–1925), regional historian
 Alojzij Šonc (1872–1958), composer
 Viktor Šonc (1878–1964), composer

References

External links

Tomaj on Geopedia
Tomaj on Visitkras

Populated places in the Municipality of Sežana